Route 31 is a  north–south state highway in the U.S. state of Massachusetts. It runs from Dudley on the Connecticut border to Ashby on the New Hampshire border.

Route description

Route 31 begins in Dudley at the Connecticut border, where it is known as Dresser Hill Road. Dresser Hill Road begins in Quinebaug, Connecticut, at Route 197 where it is a short (approximately ) local road erroneously signed as Connecticut Route 31 changing to Route 31 at the Massachusetts state line, then proceeding through Dudley and into Charlton, winding over Dresser Hill with several moderately steep grades and some tight corners.

In Charlton, it intersects U.S. Route 20 a few miles east of the I-90 and I-84 interchange. This provides its only connection with an interstate highway. In Charlton, it is known as Masonic Home Road and Brookfield Road. It then passes Lambs Pond. 

Route 31 then enters Spencer, where it parallels the Podunk Pike (Route 49) for several miles. As Charlton Road, it passes the Spencer State Forest. In the center of Spencer, it crosses Route 9. It then turns north towards Paxton; this stretch is scenic and hilly.

After a couple long, sweeping corners through a forest of pine trees, Route 31 enters Paxton. Paxton Center School comes after a treed-in section. The intersections of Route 31, Route 122, and Route 56 comprise Paxton Center. Route 31 is variously known as West Street and Holden Street in Paxton; it runs east–west in this section.

In Holden, Route 31 passes Asnebumskit Pond and is bridged over Kendall Reservoir. After the intersection with Route 122A it passes Gale Free Public Library and heads north once again. The road heads into an increasingly rural area as the hills get steeper and longer. 

Entering the center of Princeton, it joins Route 62 and turns east to avoid going over Mount Wachusett. The mountain is instead connected by Mountain Road. After separating from Route 62, Route 31 joins Route 140 and becomes Fitchburg Road near Paradise Pond.

It passes through a portion of Leominster State Forest in Westminster before an interchange with a freeway segment of Route 2. After this interchange, Route 31 becomes a city street, having shared roadway with Route 2A and a wrong-way concurrency with Route 12. It then passes through downtown Fitchburg. As it leaves Fitchburg it is called Ashby State Road. In Ashby, it connects with Route 119 before reaching the New Hampshire state border, where it becomes New Hampshire Route 31.

The stretch of Route 31 from Paxton Center to Holden Center is named the Chief Robert J. Mortell Memorial Highway, after Paxton chief of police Robert Mortell, who was killed in the line of duty on February 1, 1994, in the deeply wooded area bordering Route 31.

Major intersections

References

External links

Mass. Rt. 31 endpoint photos

031